General afferent fibers may refer to:

 General somatic afferent fiber
 General visceral afferent fibers